Cubbage is a surname. Notable people with the surname include:

B. C. Cubbage (1895–1961), American football player and coach of football and basketball
Mike Cubbage (born 1950), American baseball player
Odessa Cubbage, minor character in the first-person shooter computer game, Half-Life 2